David Hollister (born 16 October 1944) is an Australian sports shooter. He competed in the mixed 50 metre rifle prone event at the 1980 Summer Olympics.

References

External links
 

1944 births
Living people
Australian male sport shooters
Olympic shooters of Australia
Shooters at the 1980 Summer Olympics
Place of birth missing (living people)
20th-century Australian people